Jesús de Alva (born Jesús Alvarado in Maracaibo) is a Venezuelan model and television personality who rose to fame after participating in the 2014 Mister Venezuela competition.

Career
On August 30, 2018, he is named by the organization The Super Model Venezuela as the first Mister Grand Venezuela, that same year. Jesús was a student in his 5th semester at Universidad Rafael Belloso Chacín where he was studying Social Communication. He decided to participate in the 2014 Mister Venezuela competition. where he emerged as a semi-finalist. After the competition, he was cast as a host for the popular magazine show Portada's that airs on Venevisión.

In 2016, he released a line of Men's clothing designed by Oswaldo Escalante

References

External links
 Zuliano Jesús de Alva: "Sueño con animar Sábado Sensacional"
 Jesus De Alva

Venezuelan male models
Venezuelan television personalities
People from Zulia
People from Maracaibo
Year of birth uncertain
Living people
1993 births